Hu Zhaojun is a Chinese football player.

Club career
Hu Zhaojun is a defensive midfielder who started his career with Dalian Shide in 1999 where in his debut season he made six appearances. He subsequently established himself as a regular where he was known for his outstanding long-range shooting ability and excellent free kicks. During his time with Dalian he would play with one of the dominant teams in China and subsequently played a role in several league title wins. His loyalty at Dalian was cut short when the team had a terrible 2008 Chinese Super League season by fighting off relegation and many of the established stars within the team were dropped or later sold off by the recently employed manager Xu Hong. Zhaojun would sit in the reserves until Guangzhou F.C. took him on loan during the 2009 Chinese Super League season.

In February 2014, Hu transferred to Dalian Transcendence. He joined Zhejiang Yiteng on 11 July 2018.

Career Statistics 
Statistics accurate as of match played 3 November 2018.

Honours
Dalian Shide
 Chinese Jia-A League/Chinese Super League: 2000, 2001, 2002, 2005
 Chinese FA Cup: 2001, 2005
Chinese Super Cup: 2000, 2002

Guangzhou Evergrande
China League One: 2010

Dalian Aerbin
China League One: 2011

References

External links
Profile on the official Dalian Shide site (Chinese)
Profile at Sina.com (Chinese)
 
 

1981 births
Living people
Chinese footballers
Footballers from Dalian
China international footballers
Dalian Shide F.C. players
Guangzhou F.C. players
Dalian Professional F.C. players
Beijing Sport University F.C. players
Dalian Transcendence F.C. players
Zhejiang Yiteng F.C. players
Chinese Super League players
China League One players
Footballers at the 2002 Asian Games
Association football midfielders
Asian Games competitors for China